Yukseyevo is a rural locality (a selo) and the administrative center of Yukseyevskoye Rural Settlement, Kochyovsky District, Perm Krai, Russia. The population was 459 as of 2010. There are 13 streets.

Geography 
Yukseyevo is located 32 km north of Kochyovo (the district's administrative centre) by road. Mitino is the nearest rural locality.

References 

Rural localities in Kochyovsky District